Holy Trinity Church, Templebreedy is a parish church of the Church of Ireland close to Crosshaven, in County Cork, Ireland. It was designed by William Burges, who also designed Saint Fin Barre's Cathedral. The building opened in 1868 and remains an active parish church.

History

The foundation stone of Holy Trinity Church was laid on 31 October 1866 by the Right Rev'd John Gregg, D.D., then Bishop of Cork, Cloyne and Ross. The town had been growing in popularity as a holiday resort and its original church (St Matthew's Church, built in 1778) was deemed insufficient for the increasing population.  William Burges was appointed architect for a new church with a budget of £1,700, of which £500 was subscribed by parishioners and £1,200 given by the Ecclesiastical Commissioners.

The site for the new church was given by Mr. Thomas Hayes of Crosshaven House, "who gave a carte blanche to the chairman the Rev'd M. Archall, to go over all his property and select whatever site he chose for the building, and the church would be erected on one of the best fields on his estate".

The church was consecrated on Trinity Sunday in 1868, being dedicated to the Holy Trinity.

Architecture and description

The original design for the church included a substantial tower, its inspiration drawn from the medieval campanile of northern Italy, and this can be seen in an illustration in The Irish Builder from 15 April 1873.  The accompanying article spoke of the completion of the tower as fulfilling "one of the happiest of architectural compositions it has been our pleasure to describe for a very long time."  However, the tower was never built and the church comprises a more modest set of structures.  It is however identified by architectural historians as recognisably Burges's work, with J. Mordaunt Crook noting that "the smooth plate tracery, the low-slung battered porch, the emphatic string courses: these are all Burgesian trademarks." Mordaunt Crook also notes the interior as "measur(ing) up to the quality of the exterior - notably the pelican-dragon corbels of the chancel arch and the stained glass at the East end."

References

19th-century Church of Ireland church buildings
William Burges church buildings
Churches in County Cork
Church of Ireland church buildings in the Republic of Ireland
Churches in the Diocese of Cork, Cloyne and Ross
19th-century churches in the Republic of Ireland